Perini Shivathandavam (Perini Śivathandavam) or Perini Thandavam is an ancient dance form, from Telangana, which has been revived in recent time. It originated and prospered in Telangana, during the Kakatiya dynasty.
Perini is performed in honour of Lord Shiva, the hindu god of destruction and it is believed that in ancient times this was performed before the soldiers set to war. Padmasri Dr. Nataraja Ramakrishna was the person who revived this art form recently.

The dance
The Perini shiva Thandavam is a dance form usually performed by males. It is called 'Dance of Warriors'. Warriors before leaving to the battlefield enact this dance before the idol of Lord Śiva (Shiva). The dance form, Perini, reached its pinnacle during the rule of the 'Kakatiyas' who established their dynasty at Warangal and ruled for almost two centuries.

The Perini Thandavam, Telangana It is believed that this dance form invokes 'Prerana' (inspiration) and is dedicated to supreme dancer, Lord Shiva. One can find evidence of this dance in the sculptures near Garbha Gudi (Sanctum Sanctorum) of the Ramappa Temple at Warangal.

Perini is a vigorous dance done to the resounding beats of drums. Dancers drive themselves to a state of mental abstraction where they feel the power of Shiva in their body. While dancing they invoke Shiva to come into him and dance through him. The Perini Thandavam is indeed believed to be the most invigorating and intoxicating male dance form.

Perini dance form almost disappeared after the decline of the Kakatiya dynasty but Padmasri Dr. Nataraja Ramakrishna brought renaissance in Perini dance, which was on verge of extinction.

See also
 Tandava

References

External links
 Dr. Nataraja Ramakrishna

Dances of India
Classical dance genres of India
Culture of Telangana